Hugo St-Cyr (November 23, 1978 – September 24, 2015) was a Canadian actor and presenter. He became known for his role as Michel Couillard in the popular youth series  Watatatow, which aired for fourteen years on Radio-Canada Television from 1991 to 2005. This role earned him five MetroStar prizes and Gemini Awards.

Biography 
Saint-Cyr was born in Longueuil. Alongside Vincent Bolduc (Alexis) in 1993, he played the prominent role of Clément Fortin, a teenager who commits suicide in the dramatic TVA series Ent'Cadieux, written by Guy Fournier.

He played the role of Paul Rose in the miniseries October 1970, tracing the tragic events that occurred in October 1970 in Quebec. It was broadcast on CBC Television and Télé-Québec.

Since 2007, he hosted the show Podium Xtrême on Ztélé, dealing with emission technology in extreme sports. In the winter, he hosted The Car Guide on the channel Vox in Montreal.

On September 25, 2014, Echos Vedettes magazine revealed that he was suffering from cancer of the bone and undergoing chemotherapy. He died from this on September 24, 2015. He had two daughters with actress Isabelle Guérard.

Honours 
 1992 winner Gemini Awards, best dramatic interpretation Youth Program or Series for Watatatow  1997 winner Price MetroStar, best artist for Youth 'Watatatow' '
 1998: Award-winning MetroStar, best artist for Youth 'Watatatow' '
 1999: Award-winning MetroStar, best artist for Youth 'Watatatow' '
 2000: Award-winning MetroStar, best artist for Youth 'Watatatow' '
 2001: Price MetroStar winner, for best young artist 'Watatatow' '

 Filmography 

 Actor 
 1991-2005: Watatatow, Michel Couillard
 1993-1994: Ent'Cadieux, Clément Fortin
 1998: Une voix en or, drummer
 1998: Un gars, une fille, François-Xavier
 1999: Operation Tango, the Soldier Dalpé
 2003: Harmonium (miniseries), Yves Ladouceur
 2004: Jack Paradise: Montreal by Night (Jack Paradise: Les nuits de Montréal), Dan Langlais
 2007: October 1970, Paul Rose
 2008: Transit, the butcher

 Moderator 
 2007:  The Car Guide  (Vox)
 2007:  Podium Xtrême '' (Ztélé)

References

External links 
 

1978 births
People from Longueuil
2015 deaths
Deaths from bone cancer
Canadian male television actors
Canadian male film actors
Canadian male child actors
Male actors from Quebec
French Quebecers